The Friends of Ringo Ishikawa is a beat 'em up developed by Yeo for Windows on May 17, 2018. Port for macOS, Nintendo Switch, and Xbox One were released later. The game forms a series called Existential Dilogy with the follow-up game Arrest of a Stone Buddha (2020). Another similar game by the same developer, Fading Afternoon, is to be released in 2023.

Plot
The game takes place in a small-town in Japan. The player takes the role of a high school delinquent.

Gameplay
The Friends of Ringo Ishikawa is a story driven beat 'em up using 16-bit-style pixel art. The game has a freeform structure where the player can decide what to do between story sequences. These include going to school and studying, reading at the library, working out at the gym, or beating rival gang members for cash. The game's combat system draws influence from Konami's Kensei: Sacred Fist and Rockstar's Bully.

Development
The Friends of Ringo Ishikawa was developed by one person from Moscow, Russia named Vadim Gilyazetdinov, better known by his handle Yeo. All backgrounds in the game were made by Artem "Wedmak2" Belov and animations were made by Yeo's father who learned pixel art in his 60s especially for this occasion.

Release
The game was announced for PC release on April 18, 2018. The Switch release was announced on October 10, 2018.

Reception

The Friends of Ringo Ishikawa received "mixed or average" reviews according to review aggregator Metacritic.

Kohei Fujita of IGN Japan said that "The game's systems aren't well explained, which will catch many gamers off-guard at first, but its climax has a lasting impact that is worth experiencing."

Dom Reseigh-Lincoln of Nintendo Life summarized: "Screenshots really don't do The friends of Ringo Ishikawa justice. What looks like a traditional side-scrolling brawler is actually something far more intricate. It's more of a teenage simulator than anything, and with some really well-written dialogue (filled with the kind of malaise and sense of directionless rebellion we all experienced in our formative years) there's a really interesting story to be found. Its everyday activities will remind you more of Bully or Shenmue than Street Gangs/River City Ransom, just don't expect to have your hand held as you head out into the world to discover them."

Matt S. of Digitally Downloaded summarized: "The Friends of Ringo Ishikawa is one of the best examples of subversion within the brawler genre since the mighty Lollipop Chainsaw. Given that the genre is best known for being loud and boisterous, as well as straightforward, linear and providing players with explicit direction (going as far as to have flashing arrows to show players where to move next), the fact that Ringo Ishikawa is subtle, reflective, and directionless, makes it a brilliant bit of subversion. It also means it's the most surprisingly thoughtful game I have played in quite some time."

Time Extension included the game on their top 25 "Best Beat 'Em Ups of All Time" list.

References

External links

2018 video games
GameMaker Studio games
High school-themed video games
Indie video games
MacOS games
Open-world video games
Nintendo Switch games
Side-scrolling beat 'em ups
Single-player video games
Video games developed in Russia
Video games set in Japan
Windows games
Xbox One games